Takina was a town of ancient Pisidia, now an archaeological site. It may be the same town as the one called Gazena by Ptolemy and that called Tagena in the Ravenna Cosmography.

Its site is located near the modern town of Yaralli (Yarışlı) in Burdur Province, Turkey.

References

Populated places in Pisidia
Former populated places in Turkey
Archaeological sites in Turkey
History of Burdur Province
Yeşilova District